The temple of Mahlab al-Naqa, also spelled Mahlib Annaqa, is a 6th-7th century BCE  temple that was built by ancient(lihyanite), located in the Khuraybah area of al-Ula Governorate, Saudi Arabia.

History 

The temple contains a purification basin carved in front of a Lihyanite temple. Three steps have been hewn inside the basin on the northern side of the cistern to facilitate access. It was most likely built to be used in religious rituals, as it is located adjacent to a religious structure.

Bibliography 
 Abdulrahman A. Alsuhaibani, Insights into construction techniques in Dédan, northwest of Saudi Arabia, 2019.
 Abdulrahman A. Alsuhaibani, Technic of construction in the site of Dadan, 2017.

References 

Religious buildings and structures in Saudi Arabia